Sovran Bank was a US-based regional bank that operated in Virginia between 1983 and 1990, and was the leading subsidiary of Sovran Financial Corporation. It was itself a product of a merger between First & Merchants Bank of Richmond and Virginia National Bankshares of Norfolk, both of which could trace back their history to the 1860s. In 1990, it was merged with Citizens & Southern National Bank to form C&S/Sovran Corp., which in turn merged with NCNB to form NationsBank which became Bank of America in 1998.

History

First & Merchants Bank
Richmond had no bank after the federal government had revoked charters of banks whose loyalty was questioned. So eight days after Robert E. Lee's surrender at Appomattox, the city's financial leaders started a new federally chartered bank after meeting with Hamilton G. Fant. First National Bank opened for business in the Customs House. Lee was one of the new bank's early customers.

Later it merged with National Exchange Bank and moved to 10th and Main streets. Despite the financial crises of the 1890s First National Bank had the most assets of any Richmond bank at the turn of the century (1900).<ref name=nps>"Federal, State and Local Historic Districts , National Park Service. Retrieved March 21, 2007.</ref>

National Bank of Virginia merged with First National Sept. 1, 1912.

Alfred Charles Bossom of Clinton & Russell in New York City designed Richmond's first skyscraper at 9th and Main streets, completed in downtown Richmond in 1913. BB&T later occupied the building, which is on the National Register of Historic Places.

Merchants National Bank merged with First National February 27, 1926, at which time the bank became First & Merchants Bank.

In 1981, The National Bank of Fairfax merged with First & Merchants Bank. The first bank in Fairfax, Virginia, it was organized in 1902. In 1931, the bank completed construction of a new building on the site of the former Willcoxon Tavern. The Moore and McCandlish law firm, which had offices on the second floor of the former bank building built in 1905, occupied the building until 1972. Community Bank of Northern Virginia, organized in 1992 in Sterling, moved into the building that same year.

Banks which merged with First & Merchants Bank:
Savings Bank & Trust Co., January 30, 1959
First National Bank, Ashland, Virginia, December 31, 1959
Petersburg Savings & American Trust Co., December 30, 1961
Augusta National Bank, Staunton, September 29, 1962
First National Bank, Newport News, November 1, 1962
Peoples National Bank & Trust Co., Lynchburg, January 31, 1963 
First National Bank, Waynesboro, July 31, 1964
Loudoun National Bank, Leesburg, September 1, 1965
Bank of Virginia Beach, January 1, 1966
Bank of Chesapeake, January 31, 1966
Suburban National Bank of Virginia, McLean, August 1, 1970
First National Bank, Danville, June 30, 1979
Services National Bank, Arlington, November 30, 1979
The Bank of Chatham, October 1980
The National Bank of Fairfax, June 30, 1981

Virginia National Bank
Norfolk National Bank was organized in 1885 and became "not only the leading bank of Norfolk, but probably the leading bank of Virginia, having recently increased its capital to one million dollars, with a surplus of half a million." Norfolk National Bank, Trust Company of Norfolk (1895) and National Bank of Commerce (1867) joined to become Norfolk National Bank of Commerce & Trusts, which joined with Virginia National Bank of Norfolk to become National Bank of Commerce of Norfolk October 9, 1933.

People's National Bank was organized in 1903 in Roanoke.

In 1920, Church Street Bank at Church and Freemason streets in Norfolk became American Exchange Bank, whose deposits were taken over in 1924 by Virginia National Bank.

Cliff Cutchins, who in 1980 became chairman and CEO of Virginia National Bankshares Inc. and held the same positions at Sovran until his 1989 retirement, started out as a teller in 1947 at Vaughan & Co. Bankers in Franklin, Virginia. In 1960, he became president of the bank, which his grandfather had founded in 1886. In 1962, a merger with two Southampton County banks formed Tidewater Bank and Trust Co., which in turn became part of Virginia National Bank.

Virginia National Bank's 24-story Norfolk headquarters opened in January 1968.

Richmond's Virginia Trust Company could be chartered only after special legislation, since trust companies were new in the south and not all banks could have trust departments. The original board of directors included a number of tobacco company executives. James B. Pace, the first president, was a tobacco executive and the head of Planters National Bank (which became United Virginia Bank). The Virginia Trust Company building, also designed by Bossom, opened May 31, 1921, was an example of Neo-Classical Revival architecture, using granite, marble, bronze and mahogany, with a "gilded, coffered ceiling" and "a facade patterned directly after a Roman triumphal arch." Virginia Trust Company merged with Virginia National Bank in 1973.

Banks which merged with what became Virginia National Bankshares, Inc.:
Merchants & Planters Bank, Norfolk, November 4, 1957
People's National Bank of Central Virginia, Charlottesville, April 26, 1963
National Bank of Suffolk, August 23, 1963
Farmers Exchange Bank of Abingdon, September 13, 1963
Farmers & Merchants Bank, Staunton and Tidewater Bank & Trust, Franklin, December 13, 1963
First National Bank of Buena Vista and Southern Bank of Commerce, Danville, April 3, 1964
Bank of Glade Spring, January 29, 1965
People's National Bank of Farmville and First National Bank of Gate City, April 8, 1965
Merchants National Bank and Bank of Phoebus, Hampton, November 5, 1965
Peoples National Bank, Victoria and Wythe County National Bank, Wytheville, April 11, 1966 
Pulaski National Bank and Bank of Crewe, August 26, 1966
Farmers & Merchants Bank, Lawrenceville, National Bank of Woodstock, June 29, 1968
Northampton County Trust Bank, Cape Charles, November 15, 1968
Commonwealth National Bank, Arlington, August 15, 1969
First National Bank, Quantico, December 19, 1969
First National Bank, Harrisonburg, March 15, 1970 
Merchants & Farmers Bank, Smithfield, June 1, 1970
Carroll County Bank, Hillsville, November 23, 1970
First National Bank, Troutville, 1981
Farmers Exchange Bank, Coeburn, 1981
Old Colony Bank & Trust, Williamsburg
South Boston Bank & Trust Co., 1982
First State Bank of Wise, 1982
Northern Virginia Bank of Springfield, 1982
First City Bank, Newport News, 1982
Citizens National Bank, Fries, 1982
Farmers Bank, Mathews, 1982

Growth of Sovran Bank
The name Sovran came from Glenn Monigle & Associates Inc. of Denver, Colorado.

In 1985, Sovran announced a merger with Suburban Bancorp, the fourth-largest bank in Maryland at the time. Silver Spring National Bank, the first bank in Silver Spring, Maryland, in 1910, moved in 1925 when the Baltimore and Ohio Railroad underpass was built. The name changed to Suburban National Bank in 1938 when the bank took over Takoma Park Bank.

In 1986, Sovran took over D.C. National Bancorp, based in Bethesda, Maryland. In 1987, Sovran added Kentucky and Tennessee by buying 71-year-old Commerce Union'' of Nashville, Tennessee.

Sovran Bank was the largest bank in Virginia and in the District of Columbia, and it had offices in Tennessee and Maryland. In September 1989, Sovran and Citizens & Southern of Atlanta announced plans for a stock-swap merger. The combined bank had $47 billion in assets, $34 billion in deposits and 976 branches in eight states. It was originally to be named Advantor Financial Corporation. However, it was eventually called C&S/Sovran. The merged bank had dual headquarters in Atlanta and Norfolk.

Only two years later, C&S/Sovran was sent reeling by problem loans in the Washington/Northern Virginia market. Under the circumstances, it had little choice but to agree to merge with NCNB Corporation of Charlotte.  Ironically, C&S had merged with Sovran to fend off a hostile takeover attempt by NCNB. The merged bank became NationsBank.

References

External links
Photo of First National Bank building in Richmond, Virginia
Photo of First National Bank Building entrance in Richmond, Virginia
Photo of Virginia National Bank headquarters in Norfolk
Photo of Sovran Bank Building in Norfolk, Virginia (September, 1986)

Banks based in Virginia
Defunct banks of the United States
Bank of America legacy banks
Banks established in 1983
Companies based in Norfolk, Virginia
Banks disestablished in 1990
1983 establishments in Virginia
1990 disestablishments in Virginia
Defunct companies based in Virginia